"Dominick the Donkey" is a Christmas song written by Ray Allen, Sam Saltzberg and Wandra Merrell, and was recorded by Lou Monte in 1960, on Roulette Records. The song describes Dominick, a donkey who helps Santa Claus bring presents ("made in Brooklyn") to children in Italy due to the reindeer being unable to climb the hills (not all cultures believe that reindeer can fly). The song was re-released onto Amazon on September 26, 2011, on Dexterity Records. The spelling of "Dominick" was modified to "Dominic" for the re-release. It was included in Volume 2 of the Ultimate Christmas Album series produced by Collectables Records and on the Christmas compilation album Merry Xmas 2011 by Cinquenta Musica.

The song was listed at No. 14 in Billboard'''s "Bubbling under the Hot 100" list in December 1960. Santa Claus owning a donkey is later referenced in the 1977 television special Nestor, the Long–Eared Christmas Donkey. In that special, the donkey's name is "Spieltoe," who is voiced by Roger Miller and who is the narrator.

In 2018, the song was featured in the Family Guy episode "The Griffin Winter Games."

Christmas 2011 number 1 campaign
In the United Kingdom, the song was used extensively on the BBC Radio 1 morning programme The Chris Moyles Show'' in reference to Newsbeat newsreader and regular show contributor Dominic Byrne around the Christmas 2011 period. It appeared on the UK Singles Chart in that country following a campaign by Chris Moyles. In the week leading up to Christmas of 2011, the show hinted at listeners to download the song from iTunes and Amazon. This led to the song being the No. 2 song on the British iTunes chart between December 19–25, 2011. The song eventually peaked at No. 3 on the UK Singles Chart for the week ending December 31, 2011. Had the song reached No. 1, it would have achieved the record for longest time between release and reaching the summit of the British charts. The song did, however, out-chart many other campaigns in the race for the Christmas No. 1, most notably campaigns for Nirvana and Alex Day.

Charts

Weekly charts

Year-end charts

Certifications

References

1960 songs
1960 singles
American Christmas songs
Christmas characters
Fictional donkeys
Roulette Records singles
Songs about Santa Claus